Anunay Narayan Singh (born 3 January 1993) is an Indian cricketer who represents Bihar in domestic cricket and Rajasthan Royals in Indian Premier League (IPL). He is a right-handed batter and right-arm medium-fast bowler. 

He made his List A debut for Bihar in the 2018–19 Vijay Hazare Trophy on 19 September 2018. He made his first-class debut for Bihar in the 2018–19 Ranji Trophy on 1 November 2018. He made his Twenty20 debut on 9 November 2021, for Bihar in the 2021–22 Syed Mushtaq Ali Trophy. 

In February 2022, he was bought by the Rajasthan Royals in the auction for the 2022 Indian Premier League tournament.

References

External links
 

1993 births
Living people
Indian cricketers
Bihar cricketers
Place of birth missing (living people)